A carny is a carnival employee.

Carny, Carnie, or Carnies may also refer to:

Entertainment
 Carnies (film), a 2010 horror film
 Carny (1980 film), a film starring Jodie Foster
 Carny (2009 film), a television film starring Lou Diamond Phillips
 Carny (band), a psychedelic blues band from Austin, Texas
 "The Carny", a 1986 song by Nick Cave and the Bad Seeds
 "Carnies", the fifth track on Canadian rock trio Rush's 2012 album, Clockwork Angels

People

Given name
 Carnie Smith (born 1911–1979), American football player and coach
 Carnie Wilson (born 1968), American singer and television host
 Ethel Carnie Holdsworth (1886–1962), British author

Surname
 Andrew Carnie (born 1969), associate professor of linguistics at the University of Arizona
 Dave Carnie (born 1969), former editor-in-chief of Big Brother Magazine
 John Carnie (born 1927–2009), Australian politician
 John Carney (born 1964), American football player

See also

 Carney (disambiguation)
 Carry (disambiguation)